The 1926 Brownlow Medal was the third year the award was presented to the player adjudged the fairest and best player during the Victorian Football League (VFL) home and away season. Ivor Warne-Smith of the Melbourne Football Club won the medal by polling nine votes during the 1926 VFL season.

Leading votegetters

References 

1926 in Australian rules football
1926